Judicial Administration Training Institute is a statutory organization of the Bangladesh government. It is a national training institute for judges and judicial magistrates in Bangladesh.

History
Judicial Administration Training Institute was established in 1996 as a statutory organization. It was established through the Judicial Administration Training Institute Act 1995. The purpose of the institute is to train judges, magistrates and other judicial officers.

References

1996 establishments in Bangladesh
Organisations based in Dhaka
Government agencies of Bangladesh
Legal organisations based in Bangladesh